George F. Baker may refer to:
George Fisher Baker (1840–1931)  American financier and philanthropist
George Baker (baseball) (1857–1915), American baseball player

See also
George Baker (disambiguation)